Horriyeh or Hariyeh or Heriah may refer to:
 Horriyeh, Ahvaz
 Hariyeh, Mahshahr